Borger Independent School District is a public school district based in Borger, Texas, United States. The district operates one high school, Borger High School.

Finances
As of the 2010-2011 school year, the appraised valuation of property in the district was $548,516,000. The maintenance tax rate was $0.104 and the bond tax rate was $0.029 per $100 of appraised valuation.

Academic achievement
In 2011, the school district was rated "academically acceptable" by the Texas Education Agency.  Forty-nine percent of districts in Texas in 2011 received the same rating. No state accountability ratings will be given to districts in 2012. A school district in Texas can receive one of four possible rankings from the Texas Education Agency: Exemplary (the highest possible ranking), Recognized, Academically Acceptable, and Academically Unacceptable (the lowest possible ranking).

Historical district TEA accountability ratings
2011: Academically Acceptable
2010: Academically Acceptable
2009: Academically Acceptable
2008: Academically Acceptable
2007: Academically Acceptable
2006: Academically Acceptable
2005: Academically Acceptable
2004: Academically Acceptable

Schools
In the 2011-2012 school year, the district operated seven schools.
Regular instructional
Borger High (Grades 9-12)
Borger Middle (Grades 7-8)
Borger Intermediate (Grade 5-6)
 Crockett (Grade 3-4)
 Gateway (1-2)
Paul Belton Early Childhood Center (Grades PK-Kindergarten)

Special programs

Athletics
Borger High School participates in the boys sports of baseball, basketball, football, tennis, soccer, wrestling, golf and track. The school participates in the girls sports of basketball, tennis, soccer, softball, volleyball, golf and track. For the 2012 through 2013 school years, Borger High School will play football and basketball in UIL Class 3A.

See also

List of school districts in Texas
List of high schools in Texas

References

External links
Borger ISD

School districts in Hutchinson County, Texas